Mingus is a city in Palo Pinto County, Texas, United States. The population was 235 at the 2010 census.

History

In the 1960s, 1970s, and 1980s, Mingus, known as a "wet" town, had a thriving set of liquor stores and bars patronized by those in "dry" areas in Palo Pinto County and other area counties. This era in Mingus history was memorialized in a comedic country song by John Clay and the Lost Austin Band called "Road to Mingus." The lyrics tell of the deaths of three young men from Strawn, Texas, who travel to Mingus for beer, and, coming home in their '39 Ford, try to beat the Katy at a crossing and die when they are struck by the "reckless railroad train."

Area residents blamed aggressive law enforcement for the demise of the stores and bars. By the 2000s, the Cossacks Motorcycle Club patronized the remaining commercial establishments in the town.

Geography

Mingus is located at  (32.539489, –98.423449).

Demographics

As of the census of 2000, there were 246 people, 110 households, and 59 families residing in the city. The population density was 158.3 people per square mile (61.3/km). There were 136 housing units at an average density of 87.5/sq mi (33.9/km). The racial makeup of the city was 89.84% White, 0.41% Native American, 0.41% Asian, 8.54% from other races, and 0.81% from two or more races. Hispanic or Latino of any race were 10.57% of the population.

There were 110 households, out of which 25.5% had children under the age of 18 living with them, 39.1% were married couples living together, 11.8% had a female householder with no husband present, and 45.5% were non-families. 41.8% of all households were made up of individuals, and 16.4% had someone living alone who was 65 years of age or older. The average household size was 2.24 and the average family size was 3.18.

In the city, the population was spread out, with 23.6% under the age of 18, 10.2% from 18 to 24, 18.7% from 25 to 44, 27.6% from 45 to 64, and 19.9% who were 65 years of age or older. The median age was 43 years. For every 100 females, there were 89.2 males. For every 100 females age 18 and over, there were 82.5 males.

The median income for a household in the city was $28,750, and the median income for a family was $40,208. Males had a median income of $30,417 versus $25,625 for females. The per capita income for the city was $22,591. About 7.5% of families and 11.7% of the population were below the poverty line, including none of those under the age of eighteen and 19.6% of those 65 or over.

Education
The City of Mingus is served by the Gordon Independent School District.

Climate
The climate in this area is characterized by hot, humid summers and generally mild to cool winters.  According to the Köppen Climate Classification system, Mingus has a humid subtropical climate, abbreviated "Cfa" on climate maps.

References

Cities in Texas
Cities in Palo Pinto County, Texas